Charles Thompson (April 1909 – 1979) was an English professional footballer. He played as a midfielder for Liverpool and Barrow. He was also on the books of Blackpool.

External links
 LFC History profile

1909 births
1979 deaths
English footballers
Liverpool F.C. players
Blackpool F.C. players
Barrow A.F.C. players
Date of birth missing
Date of death missing
Association football midfielders